Indonesian National Route 13 is a road in Indonesia's national route system, and its course is entirely within the borders of the DKI Jakarta province. Its 15 kilometre path goes alongside Java's arterial highway route, the Indonesian National Route 1, and is also indirectly connected to another route, that being the Indonesian National Route 2. Like the nearby Indonesian National Route 2 (the route mentioned previously), the road has been completely transformed into a toll road; that being the Prof. Ir. Wiyoto Wiyono toll road.

Route
Jakarta: Tanjung Priok - Sunter - Kelapa Gading - Cempaka Putih - Jatinegara - Cawang

References
 http://hubdat.dephub.go.id/keputusan-dirjen/tahun-2007/561-keputusan-dirjen-no-sk-930aj/download 
 http://hubdat.dephub.go.id/keputusan-dirjen/tahun-2008/562-peraturan-dirjen-sk-1207aj/download 

Indonesian National Routes
Transport in West Java
Transport in Banten